Hinukay Ko Na ang Libingan Mo is a 1991 Philippine action film directed by Manuel "Fyke" Cinco. The film stars Robin Padilla on dual roles.

Plot
Anton (Robin Padilla) has just married his fiancée, Vera (Nanette Medved), when an old man, Laroza (Eddie Garcia), rapes his wife, mauls him and leaves him for dead. Elmo (also played by Robin Padilla) is an ex-convict who initially tries to take his share of inheritance, but inherits instead Anton's problems. He accepts this to repent for his sin, having accidentally committed patricide which left he and his twin to fend for themselves. While Elmo takes his time, Anton takes his vengeance in fruition.

Elmo tries to reconnect with his former life as a part of his vengeance for his twin, and along the way meets Vera, now going undercover by the name of Mariposa. Elmo would soon be reunited with Anton, long presumed dead, who is enraged at his sight that he decides to take the revenge in his own hands. Elmo's pregnant live-in partner, Janet (Cherry Pie Picache), dies in an encounter with one of Laroza's thugs.

Anton and Vera abducts Laroza and his family. Anton orders Laroza's son to bury the old man alive. However, before Anton's revenge is fully exacted, a firefight ensues and Elmo comes to the aid of Anton and Vera. After the dust settled, Anton, Elmo and Vera emerged as the survivors, having killed Laroza and finally serving justice to all the wrongs committed by the old man.

Cast

Robin Padilla as Elmo and Anton
Nanette Medved as Vera/Mariposa
Cherry Pie Picache as Janet
Eddie Garcia as Laroza San Vicente
Dencio Padilla as Berting
Dindo Arroyo as Turko
Lucita Soriano as Laroza's Wife
Marco Polo Garcia as Ricky
Mayleen Zapanta as Yvette
Daryl Lance as Opet
Naty Santiago as Vera's Mother
Eva Ramos as Anton's Mayordoma
Odette Khan as Club Manager
Jess Ramos as Old man at Forest
Val Iglesias as Prisoner with fight
Cesar Iglesias as Jail Guard

References

External links
 

1991 films
1991 action films
Filipino-language films
Philippine action films
Viva Films films
Films directed by Manuel Cinco